Sébastien Thinel (born March 24, 1981) is a retired Canadian professional ice hockey Winger.

On August 23, 2011, Thinel was signed by the Missouri Mavericks of the Central Hockey League for the 2011-12 season.  During that season, Thinel became the first player in team history to score at least 80 Points in a season (82 Points on 23 Goals and 59 Assists)  That season, he also broke Jeff Christian's franchise record of Points scored in a season (78 Points set during the team's inaugural 2009-10 season).

On July 19, 2012, it was announced that Thinel re-signed with the Mavericks for the 2012-13 Missouri Mavericks season.

On June 13, 2013, it was announced that Thinel re-signed with the Mavericks for the 2013-14 season.  During that season, on February 15, 2014 against the Allen Americans, Thinel scored his 300th goal in the Central Hockey League, becoming only the sixth player in league history to do so.  During a 5-2 win against the Quad City Mallards on March 5, 2014, Thinel became only the third player in Central Hockey League history to score 900 career Points in the Central Hockey League.  In a game against the Brampton Beast on March 16, 2014, Thinel climbed to second place on the All-Time Central Hockey League Assist list with 602 Assists.

On July 7, 2014, Thinel re-signed with the Missouri Mavericks for the 2014-15 season.  On October 7, 2014, it was announced that the Central Hockey League had folded and had joined the ECHL, nullifying Thinel's Central Hockey League contract with the team.  On October 9, 2014, Thinel re-signed with the Mavericks under an ECHL contract.

In July 2014, Missouri Mavericks fans voted Thinel the Number 1 greatest Mavericks player in a poll of the Top-10 Mavericks players from the first 5 years of the team's existence.

On June 3, 2015, Thinel signed with the French club Brûleurs de Loups de Grenoble of League Magnus.

Ahead of the 2016/17 season, Thinel signed for the Fife Flyers of the UK's EIHL.

Thinel has since played for LNAH side Rivière-du-Loup 3L and Cornwall Senior Prowlers in the Ligue de Hockey Senior A de l'Outaouais (LHSAO).

On Jan. 12th, 2019 the Kansas City Mavericks retired his jersey, number 43, at a ceremony at the Silverstein Eye Center Arena.

His twin brother Marc-André was also a professional hockey player; they were teammates for three years as juniors at Victoriaville Tigres, and during the 2006–07 season at Rouen.

Awards and honours

References

External links

1981 births
Living people
Canadian ice hockey forwards
People from Saint-Jérôme
Brûleurs de Loups players
Cincinnati Cyclones (ECHL) players
Drummondville Voltigeurs players
French Quebecers
Ice hockey people from Quebec
Odessa Jackalopes players
Quebec Remparts players
Rouen HE 76 players
Victoriaville Tigres players
Missouri Mavericks players
Fife Flyers players
Canadian expatriate ice hockey players in the United States
Canadian expatriate ice hockey players in Scotland
Canadian expatriate ice hockey players in France
Twin sportspeople
Canadian twins